Géraldine Pailhas (born 8 January 1971) is a French actress. She had her first international success in 1995 as Doña Anna, the unfulfilled love of Johnny Depp in the comedy Don Juan DeMarco. She is married to actor Christopher Thompson and has two children. In 2003, she was the main presenter at the César Awards ceremony.

Selected filmography

Awards
 1992: César Award for Most Promising Actress La neige et le feu.
 2001: Best TV actress at "Festival de la fiction TV" in Saint Tropez for L'Héritière
 2004: Nomination as César Award for Best Actress in a Supporting Role for Le coût de la vie.

References

External links

 
 Biography

1971 births
Living people
Actresses from Marseille
French film actresses
French stage actresses
French television actresses
21st-century French actresses
20th-century French actresses
Most Promising Actress César Award winners